South Masson Range is the Masson Range is divided into three parts of which this segment is the southern, rising to 1,070 m and extending 2 nautical miles (3.7 km) in a NE-SW arc. The Masson Range was discovered and named by British Australian New Zealand Antarctic Research Expedition (BANZARE), 1929–31, under Mawson. This southern range was mapped by Norwegian cartographers from air photos taken by the Lars Christensen Expedition, 1936–37, and named Sorkammen (the south comb or crest). The approved name, suggested by Antarctic Names Committee of Australia (ANCA) in 1960, more clearly identifies the feature as a part of Masson Range.

Mountain ranges of Mac. Robertson Land